Marianad (also spelled Mariyanadu or Mariyanad) is a coastal town in south Indian state of Kerala. It belongs to Kadinamkulam grama panchayat in Thiruvananthapuram district of southern Kerala. Marianad is 25 KM away from Thiruvananthapuram city which is both district headquarters and state capital. Marianad is under the area of Puthukurichy post office and PIN code is 695303.

It is part of the Attingal Lok Sabha constituency

History
Marianad was founded by Bishop Peter Bernard Periera who was the head of the Latin church in Thiruvananthapuram with the help of the Social Service society and other social volunteers. One of the known volunteers was an Italian nurse Lauretta Farina who coordinated schools, health clinics, sports clubs, women's collective, etc. In the late 1970s, the fishers founded cooperative societies to avoid merchant money lenders to sell their fish.

Economy

Marianad and the neighboring villages had trade connections with various Arab countries such as Saudi Arabia and the UAE from the 19th century onwards. The economy of the village is majorly based on fishing and the export of marine products. This industry helped people to develop their infrastructure and education in recent years.and some people are works and studying abroad countries like UK,Australia,Canada,USA etc

Facilities
The major institutions in the government/private sector of Marianad include:

 Our Lady Of Assumption Church, Marianad
 Vidyasadan CBSE Central School, Marianad
 BPBPM Library, Marianad
 St.Xaviers College
 BPBPM Football ground(j)
 Animation Centre
 Muthoot Gold Loan, Pvt Finance, Puthucurichy
 Govt. Hospital, Puthenthope
 District Cooperative bank
 St. Michael's High School, Puthukurichy
 St. Vincent High school, Padinjattumukku
 Our Lady of Mercy Convent, Puthukurichy
 Coir Society, Padinjattumukku
 G Tracks Screen1 & 2 Cinemas Kadinamkulam
 Kadinamkulam Police Station
 State Bank of Travancore
 Jyoti Nilayam English Medium Higher Secondary School
 Government Ayurveda Dispensary
 Grace Motors Mariyanad
 Prince Tailors & Stores

Marianad is well connected by Kerala Transport Corporation buses departing every 30 minutes to Trivandrum city. For Marianad get the bus from Trivandrum bus station which named Perumathura. When driving to Marianad, take a left turn from Kaniyapuram on the Thiruvananthapuram–Kollam National Highway.

References

External links 
 MARIANAD FISHING VILLAGE STORY - Youtube

 Villages in Thiruvananthapuram district